The Jacob P. Lockman House is a historic house in Nampa, Idaho. It was built in 1906 for Jacob P. Lockman, a Danish immigrant who owned a saloon in Ketchum and served as the mayor of Wallace before opening a brewery in Nampa. The house was designed in the American Foursquare style. It has been listed on the National Register of Historic Places since July 27, 2005.

References

	
National Register of Historic Places in Canyon County, Idaho
American Foursquare architecture
Houses completed in 1906
1906 establishments in Idaho